Faree is a 2021 Maldivian film written and directed by Ahmed Hisham Saeed. The film stars Nuzuhath Shuaib and Ravee Farooq in lead roles. The film follows a single mother through her decision to leave a deteriorating marriage as she confronts the dysfunctional life she left behind. The film had a digital premiere on 29 March 2021.

Premise
Concerned with Umar's (Yaafi Mohamed Hameed) behavioral change, the school management meets with his mother, Faree (Nuzuhath Shuaib) who is trying to relieve herself and her son from an abusive marriage with a drug addict, Faidh (Ravee Farooq). Meanwhile, Faree's younger sister, Aisthu (Aishath Thasmeena) begins a romantic relationship with a married man which further disturbs their mother (Fauziyya Hassan). She advises Faree to get back with Faidh and sort their differences out, though Faree has a difference of opinion. Although influenced by his friend, Suhail (Mohamed Yunaan), Faidh desperately tries to restore his relationship with Faree and their son.

Cast 
 Nuzuhath Shuaib as Faree
 Ravee Farooq as Faidh
 Yaafi Mohamed Hameed as Umar
 Fauziyya Hassan as Rashidha
 Ahmed Easa as Sappe
 Mohamed Yunaan as Suhail
 Aishath Thasmeena as Aisthu
 Abdulla Rasheed Moosa as Farooq
 Ahmed Shan as Soba
 Sheerin Ali as Suhails' girlfriend
 Mariyam Afaaf Adam as Secretary
 Mohamed Maaiz Sobah as College Receptionist
 Ibrahim Hamdhan Abdullah as Clinic Receptionist
 Ahmed Shamoon Zahir as Lecturer
 Mohamed Rifshan as Thug 1
 Saami Hussain Didi as Thug 2

Development
Following the success of Vishka (2017), Madhoship Studio initiated in developing a feature film titled Bagalhey which got delayed indefinitely due to the high production cost. Hence, the crew moved to their next project titled Faree, which is part of the anthology being produced by the studio and narrating the life of a single mother. In June 2018, a casting call was opened for interested actors where acting workshops were conducted for the shortlisted actors before finalizing the cast. Filming commenced on 15 July 2018 and continued for almost a month. According to the director of the film Ahmed Hisham Saeed, in order to present the film in the most realistic pacing, the film will not have any songs in it.

Soundtrack

Release
The film was scheduled for theatrical release on 2 April 2020, but was postponed due to the COVID-19 pandemic. Later, citing the closure of cinema, the team announced that the film will have a digital premiere where it will be made available for streaming through Baiskoafu application from 29 March 2021.

References

Maldivian drama films
2021 films
Films postponed due to the COVID-19 pandemic
2021 drama films
Dhivehi-language films

External links